Aucazein is a commune in the Ariège department in the Occitanie region of south-western France.

The inhabitants of the commune are known as Aucazénois.

Geography
Aucazein is located in the Ariège Natural Regional Park some 40 km south-east of Saint-Gaudens in a direct line and 20 km west by south-west of Saint-Girons at an altitude of 570 metres. Access to the commune is by road D 618 from Orgibet in the west which passes through the north of the commune and the village and continues east to Argein. Most of the land area of the commune is rugged and forested however the valley where the village is located has some farmland.

The Bouigane river flows east along the valley and through the village on its way to join the Lez at Audressein. The Ruisseau de Cassech forms the western border of the commune as it flows north to join the Bouigane. Similarly La Rivière forms the eastern border of the commune and also joins the Bouigane. The Ruisseau de Recoule flows from the north and passes through the commune for a short distance before joining the Bouigane.

Neighbouring communes and villages

History
The commune is located on the Way of St. James which crosses Ariège. The Knights Templar built a Romanesque chapel in the commune.

Administration

List of Successive Mayors

Demography
In 2017 the commune had 59 inhabitants.

Sites and monuments

The commune has one site that is registered as a historical monument:
An Ornamental Garden

The commune has some other sites of interest:
The Remains of a feudal Chateau (private property)
2 Mills
An Oratory
The Church of Saint-Aubin
A Metal Bridge built in 1905 over the Bouigane

See also
Communes of the Ariège department

References

External links
Aucazein on Géoportail, National Geographic Institute (IGN) website 
Aucasein on the 1750 Cassini Map

Communes of Ariège (department)